François Winnepenninckx (26 March 1919 – 15 October 1988) was a Belgian footballer. He played in one match for the Belgium national football team in 1939.

References

External links
 

1919 births
1988 deaths
Belgian footballers
Belgium international footballers
Place of birth missing
Association football midfielders